Lucien Bouchardeau (18 December 1961 – 20 February 2018) was a Nigerien football referee. Born in Niamey, he is best remembered for having officiated in 1998 a World Cup first round match between Italy and Chile. He called a penalty against Chile in the 85th minute, which allowed Italy the chance to tie the match 2-2. Following the game he talked to the press about his fear he would be sacked from the tournament, which would mark the end of his career. He also officiated matches at the 1996 Olympics, 1997 Confederations Cup and the 1998 and 1996 African Cup of Nations. He died on 20 February 2018 at the age of 56 from heart failure.

References

External links
Profile

1961 births
2018 deaths
People from Niamey
Nigerien football referees
FIFA World Cup referees
1998 FIFA World Cup referees
Olympic football referees